Bethany Joy Lenz (born April 2, 1981) is an American actress, singer-songwriter and filmmaker. She is known for her portrayal of Haley James Scott on The WB / The CW television drama One Tree Hill (2003–2012). She also starred as Michelle Bauer Santos on the CBS Daytime soap opera Guiding Light (1998–2000), and is recognized for her music as a solo artist and as a member of the band Everly.

Career

Acting
While on a trip to Los Angeles, Lenz landed her first professional job in a commercial for dolls from the teen drama series Swans Crossing. Lenz eventually went on to appear in commercials for Eggo Waffles, Dr Pepper and others. She continued to find work steadily as an actress, and by her second year in high school she landed the role of Linda Halleck in Stephen King's Thinner. She appeared in various pilots, commercials and films, and performed regional theatre until she was eventually cast as a series regular on Guiding Light.

At the age of seventeen, Lenz played the teenage clone of Reva Shayne on the CBS Daytime soap opera Guiding Light for nine episodes. Her stint earned her such favorable reviews from viewers, critics, and Guiding Light executives alike that Lenz was eventually recast as Michelle Bauer Santos upon Rebecca Budig's exit. This unusual move was described as "unheard of" in the industry according to CBS producer Mickey Dwyer-Dobbin. In 1999, while working on Guiding Light, she graduated from Eastern Christian High School in New Jersey. She also landed the role of Rose Cronin in Mary and Rhoda, a made-for-television movie that reunited Mary Tyler Moore and Valerie Harper as Mary Richards and Rhoda Morgenstern. At the time Lenz juggled a heavy storyline, a television movie portraying Mary Tyler Moore's daughter, a one-year run of a New York cabaret called Foxy Ladies Love/Boogie 70's Explosion, and the lead role in an independent film. Lenz also filmed two pilots: one playing the daughter of Paul Sorvino, and the other as the lead in the WB's 1972.

At the end of her two-year contract with The Guiding Light, she left her role as Michelle Bauer Santos and moved from New York City to Los Angeles. In Los Angeles, Lenz was directed by Garry Marshall playing Pinky Tuscadero in Happy Days: the Musical (musical directors Carole King and Paul Williams) and by Arthur Allan Seidleman in a staged reading of a musical version of The Outsiders. During this time, Lenz also landed guest appearances on Off Centre, Charmed, Felicity, Maybe It's Me and The Guardian. In 2002 Lenz joined the cast of Bring It On Again as Marni Potts, the co-captain of the varsity cheerleading squad.

When she was twenty-two, Lenz was cast in the WB television series One Tree Hill. She originally auditioned for the roles of Brooke Davis and Haley James. She landed the role of Haley James, the quintessential girl-next-door, who is best friends with Lucas Scott, portrayed by Chad Michael Murray, and wife of Nathan Scott, portrayed by James Lafferty. During her time on One Tree Hill, Lenz was also offered the role of Belle in Beauty and the Beast when it was still in production on Broadway, but turned it down due to scheduling conflicts. Lenz appeared in an episode of Life Unexpected alongside Kate Voegele as part of a crossover-event between One Tree Hill and Life Unexpected.

In the sixth season, Lenz made her directorial debut. She initially approached producer Greg Prange in 2007 with the idea of directing but was not given the opportunity to do so until two years later. Over the course of season six Lenz shadowed several directors, watched them prepare, and went on location scouts. Lenz directed two more episodes.

After eight seasons on air, One Tree Hill returned for thirteen episodes in its ninth and final season. The show ended on April 4, 2012.

In 2012, Lenz decided to concentrate on projects that were "strategically designed to move her career in a direction that was not quite the same thing as she was doing on One Tree Hill". In September 2012, it was confirmed that Lenz would guest star on an episode of Men at Work. She played the role of Meg, a single mother who the character Tyler begins to date. She said the first few days were hard because she had not done comedy for some time.

In March 2013, it was confirmed that Lenz would have a recurring role on Dexter. Her character Cassie was described as "an attractive former finance executive looking for a quieter life". Lenz's character appeared in four episodes of the final season.

In late September 2013, Lenz landed the role of Lauren Byrd on the pilot Songbyrd for E! The show centered around Lauren, a genius songwriter who employs a small staff, including her sister, to enable and manage her eccentric, yet wildly successful process. Production for Songbyrd began in late January 2014 in New York City, but the show was not picked up by E!

In the second quarter of 2015, Lenz was cast in the Shonda Rhimes drama, The Catch, for ABC, playing the role of Zoe. On May 18, 2015, Lenz revealed she was being replaced; she wrote, "Looks like they need a different type for Zoe, so I'll be replaced," though she still encouraged fans to watch the show.

Early in 2016, Lenz starred in her friend Kristin Fairweather's first short film, Grace. She also appeared in March 2016 in two episodes of third season of Agents of S.H.I.E.L.D. In mid-2016, she was cast in the new drama American Gothic as a character named April. Producer Corinne Brinkerhoff said about Lenz, "We love her! She's fantastic. She plays a witty, insightful nurse at a rehab facility."

In 2021, started a podcast with One Tree Hill co-stars, Hilarie Burton and Sophia Bush, titled Drama Queens.

Music
After Lenz's exit from Guiding Light, she completed a demo of original music. Trained by the director of the Brooklyn College of Opera, Lenz plays the guitar and piano, and writes her own music. Her first album, entitled Preincarnate, was released in October 2002. She worked under the direction of director Garry Marshall and alongside musician Carole King on a new musical adapted from the series Happy Days. She also took the opportunity to work in a public reading of a musical version of the novel The Outsiders directed by Arthur Allan Seidelman. 

While working on One Tree Hill she continued to release new music. In 2005, after recording "When the Stars Go Blue" with costar Tyler Hilton, the duo joined The Wreckers (Michelle Branch and Jessica Harp), and Gavin DeGraw for a 25-city North American One Tree Hill Tour that started in Vancouver. Lenz and Hilton scored the No. 89 spot in February 2005's Billboard Pop 100 chart with the duet "When the Stars Go Blue". While on tour, Lenz debuted her second independent record entitled, Come On Home, and filmed her first music video for "Songs in My Pockets" at Coney Island Beach and Astroland in Brooklyn, New York.

In 2006, alongside ex-American Idol judge Kara DioGuardi, Lenz co-wrote and recorded "Halo" which was released on the second volume of the One Tree Hill Soundtrack. During this time, Lenz signed a deal with Sony Epic Records and worked with her producer, Ron Aniello (Lifehouse, Guster, Barenaked Ladies) to record original material. In 2006, after changes within the company, Lenz left the label. Despite this setback, Lenz traveled to Los Angeles to write and record several songs for the soundtrack for Ten Inch Hero in 2006. Lenz's split with Epic allowed her to sign with the independent record label Hillasterion.

In 2008, Lenz formed the band Everly with her lifelong friend, Amber Sweeney. Immediately after the duo was formed, they teamed up with musical act Angels & Airwaves, and Kate Voegele for a live USO concert event for military personnel. This was filmed and formed the basis for a One Tree Hill episode, titled "Even Fairy Tale Characters Would Be Jealous".

In 2012, the Everly band split after four years of collaboration, the two artists preferring to focus on their solo careers. In November of the same year, Lenz joined fellow One Tree Hill co-star Michael Grubbs of the band Wakey!Wakey! and other singers at the Gramercy Theatre in New York City for the BTF Concerts: Rock The Schools 2012 concert. She performed new songs and two duets with Grubbs entitled "I Know" and "Irresistible". At the concert, she sold a 9-song CD entitled Then Slowly Grows.

During an interview with Shine On Media in May 2013, Lenz stated she was meeting with long-time friend and music producer Jeff Cohen to record an album. On May 22, 2013, Lenz tweeted a picture of the recording studio. The caption read, "Recording new music in #Nashville with old pal Jeff Cohen! #LeavingTownAlive #CrazyGirls" On June 4, 2013, Lenz tweeted "Sneak peek at my new album..." and linked a video on WhoSay to a new song "Please".

During an interview with Mary Ann Albright in late July 2013, Lenz talked about her musical career plans. She shared her intention to release her first full-length studio album, entitled Your Woman in the near future as an independent release on her blog. Lenz went on to say, "The best way I can describe this album is Patsy Cline meets Paula Cole meets Sam Cooke."

On August 10, 2013, the song "Please" featuring Lenz was released on vibedeck and August 11 on iTunes for her fans after she had performed it at the Rock the Schools Concert in 2012. On July 18, 2014, Lenz released "Calamity Jane" on iTunes. The song was a teaser for her soon-to-be-released album. Lenz stated: "While I'm reworking my album, here's a little teaser. This song will sound totally different on the new record, but I thought you'd enjoy hearing this version." On July 21, the song was on her WhoSay site and later on her SoundCloud site.

In November 2014, Lenz created a Kickstarter fundraising page for her new EP. Production on the EP began in early December. As well as supporting the new EP, fans were able to give back to the charity Stop the Traffik. The project, entitled "Get Back to Gold" was released (iTunes, Amazon.com) on December 23, 2014, and was a sneak peek for her new album.

Due to legal proceedings with her producer, David Waechter, the project was halted. Lenz decided to change her team and now performs as Joy Lenz and the Firepit Band. The lineup consists of WhiteRose (Danny Shyman) on guitar, Doo Crowder on vocals and guitar, Ben Zelico on drums and Meaghan Maples and Brittany Gilmore as back up singers. They toured from May to July 2016 and said an album was in preparation for 2017.

In December 2020, Lenz released her first solo Christmas album, entitled Snow. The album was produced by Mike Bundlie and released under Poets Road Records. It featured six songs, with four being originals by Lenz. The song "My Christmas with You" features Anthony Evans from the Voice and "Listen" features her daughter.

The Notebook musical 

In 2005, after seeing Nick Cassavetes' film The Notebook and subsequently reading Nicholas Sparks' best selling novel of the same name, Lenz found herself singing songs around her house based on the story's characters. After six weeks, she decided to put them down on paper. She brought the idea to her producer Ron Aniello and they decided to form Galeotti & Aniello Productions. On December 7, 2006, Lenz revealed on her website bethanyjoylenz.com, that they were writing a musical. After finishing the libretto, Lenz passed it on to a friend close to the Sparks family who gave it to the book's author. He loved it and she procured the rights to the musical.

The auditions took place in early August 2009 at Thalian Hall. Paul Teal and Kendra Goehring-Garett were cast as lead roles of Noah and Alli. The Notebook musical was workshopped in a small black box theater in October 2009 in front of Broadway producers and investors, and Nicholas Sparks who came for the occasion. Lenz said that all the feedback the she and Aniello received was positive. The producers said the music was "amazing" and did not require any modification, and "everybody loved the dialogue, and they thought the story was well-crafted". On the playbill, she thanks some friends from One Tree Hill cast including Paul Johansson, Allison Munn and Jana Kramer.

On February 10 and 11, 2010, Lenz revealed on Facebook that she was recording songs with the other singers for the musical. On March 6, 2010, Lenz said that she was rewriting passages including some songs. In July 2010, the duo revealed on their website the list of the songs : "The Colors Play", "Carolina Moon", "Troublesome Tongue", "Sunday Train", "The Nightclub Swing!", "Think of Me (When You are Gone)", "Psalm 148", "My Christmas With You" and "The Luckiest Girl". They were written by both Lenz and Aniello.

In November 2010, in response to Twitter followers successfully raising more than $2000 in one day for the charity Love146, Lenz released the song "Troublesome Tongue". The song features Noah's father and his friends explaining Noah's childhood stutter to new love Allie (played by Lenz on the recording). In December 2010, Paul Teal, who played Noah, released the song "Sunday Train" from the demo score on YouTube. In October 2011, Lenz revealed on her website www.bethanyjoy.com that she attended the 15th Anniversary for The Notebook with Nicholas Sparks, with whom she has become great friends.

Personal life

Lenz married former Enation keyboardist, Michael Galeotti, on December 31, 2005. In 2011, Lenz gave birth to a daughter. In March 2012, Lenz announced that she would be divorcing her husband after six years of marriage. She wrote: "We remain friendly and dedicated to raising our beautiful girl in love and we appreciate your prayers and support during this difficult time."

Philanthropy
Introduced to Love146 by former Everly bandmate, Amber Sweeney, Lenz has been actively supporting the international human rights organization largely through social media outlets. On June 12, 2011, she revealed details of her newest project – an online boutique called Lark, selling apparel with original designs by Lenz. All proceeds benefit Love146, To Write Love On Her Arms, as well as Reading is Fundamental.

Jewelry
In July 2016, Lenz designed her own jewelry line in partnership with Stilnest. She delayed the launch by one week following the attack in Nice, ultimately launching on July 23, 2016. The pieces feature a buffalo motif, which was inspired by a trip Lenz took to Fort Apache. Lenz donated ten percent of the profits to the Tanka Fund.

Filmography

Film

Television

As a director or producer

Podcasts

Theater

Awards and nominations

Discography

The following is a list of albums and songs by Bethany Joy Lenz that has been recorded.

Studio albums

EPs

Singles

Miscellaneous songs
 "215"
 "February Leather"
 "Cameron"
 "I'll Never Walk Alone"
 "The Loneliness is Better Near Now" Was released on her old music site back in 2005, April 13
 "One More Thing" Released by Bethany herself | Where? When? Produced by Ron Thaler, Recorded in New York City 2002
 "Ophelia" Released on September 14, 2005, as she was stuck inside waiting out hurricane Ophelia
 "Troublesome Tongue" An exclusive track from "The Notebook" Musical | Released November 5, 2010, on mymusicstream, by Bethany herself as a thank you reward to her fans for supporting the organization Love 146 which raises awareness on child sex trafficking
 "Street Where You Live" Originally From: 1956 Broadway Musical "My Fair Lady" | An Easter treat for her fans on her blog – April 24, 2011
 "It Happens" Released on August 5, 2011 | Video Karaoke of Sugarland's "It Happens" for HelloGiggles
 "It's Magic" Released on September 29, 2011, on SoundCloud
 "Someone to Watch Over Me" Released on April 8, 2012, on WhoSay | Video Karaoke for her Novel, Diamond Gothic
 "Lullaby" Released on June 21, 2012, on WhoSay | "Just a little lullaby for the night drifters"

References

External links

 
 Official Bethany Joy Lenz Blog
 
 
 Bethany Joy Lenz's Biography On the CW's Page

1981 births
Actresses from Texas
American soap opera actresses
American film actresses
American television actresses
Living people
People from Bartow, Florida
People from Hollywood, Florida
Actresses from Florida
21st-century American actresses
20th-century American actresses
Musicians from Florida
21st-century American women musicians